Monkeypox outbreak may refer to:

 2022 monkeypox outbreak, a global outbreak
 2017–2019 Nigeria monkeypox outbreak
 2003 Midwest monkeypox outbreak, in the United States
 Outbreak of monkeypox at Rotterdam Zoo, in 1964

See also